During the 1990–91 season, Red Star Belgrade participated in the 1990–91 Yugoslav First League, 1990–91 Yugoslav Cup and 1990–91 European Cup.

Pre-season and friendlies

Trofeo Villa de Madrid

Squad

The 1991 European Cup Winner Generation

Coach:
  Ljupko Petrović, born in Brusnica Velika, SR Bosnia and Herzegovina, spent his  career in Yugoslavia playing with Osijek in the 1970s, and afterwards, in the United States playing indoor soccer during the early 1980s. In 1982, he returned to Yugoslavia and started his coaching career at Osijek youth levels. In 1984, he became assistant manager at Spanish side Espanyol and not long afterwards returned to Osijek, this time to be head coach of the main team. Later, he spent one season with Spartak Subotica before taking charge of Yugoslav national team youth levels during 1987 and 1988. Next, he replaced Ivica Brzić in Vojvodina in 1988 and achieved an exceptional result by winning the Yugoslav championship in 1989, a title they were chasing for 33 years. It became clear that in between much stronger clubs, Vojvodina won due in large of the exceptional skills of Petrović as coach. This success made him become desired by Red Star directive board, who brought him shortly after along with their star player, Siniša Mihajlović. After winning the European Cup with Red Star, Petrović notability expanded abroad and, as result, in the following decades he coached clubs in Spain, Uruguay, Greece, UAE, Austria, Croatia, China, Kazakhstan, Rwanda, Bulgaria, Vietnam, and the list is still expanding.

Goalkeepers:
  Stevan Stojanović (Captain), born in Kosovska Mitrovica, SR Serbia, was the main Red Star goalkeeper for almost a decade. He later played with Royal Antwerp in Belgium. He was Yugoslav U-21 and Olympic international. He was the captain of the team and after retiring became players agent. During the period Dragan Stojković was Red Star president, he returned to the club as sporting director.
  Željko Kaluđerović, born in Bar, SR Montenegro, came to Red Star from Mornar. He later played with Djurgården in Sweden.
  Milić Jovanović, born in Belgrade, SR Serbia, came to Red Star from Napredak, and later played in Portugal.

Defenders:
  Duško Radinović, born in SR Montenegro, played with OFK Titograd and Sutjeska before joining Red Star. Afterwards, he played in Sweden. He got injured day before the final and missed the game because of it, but his contribution in the campaign was significant. After retiring, "Radin" continued living in Sweden, where he became a high school teacher and kept his links with football by being the assistant manager of Malmö City FC.
  Slobodan Marović, born in Bar, SR Montenegro, played with Osijek before joining Red Star. Afterwards, he continued his career in Sweden, Denmark and China. He was a Yugoslav international. After retiring, he dedicated to tourism, renting apartments in his hometown, Bar. Later, between 2010 and 2012, he was assistant manager at Red Star while Prosinečki was the coach.
  Refik Šabanadžović, born in Tuzi, SR Montenegro, a Montenegrin Bosniak, he played with Željezničar Sarajevo where he became one of their most notable players during the mid-1980s and a Yugoslav national team player. He came to Red Star in 1987 and played four seasons in Belgrade. Later, he moved to Greece where he played seven seasons in the very top of Greek football with AEK Athens and Olympiacos. He finished his career in the United States. He was a member of the Yugoslav 1988 Olympic squad and played in the 1990 FIFA World Cup. Nowadays, he lives between Podgorica and Sarajevo where he owns two cafes, Studio 5 and Studio 4 respectively.
  Miodrag Belodedici, born in Socol, Romania, was the only foreigner in Red Star that season, although his family is member of the Serbian minority in Romania. He came to Red Star after defecting from Ceaușescu's regime in 1988. By the time he came, he was already a well established player. He had already won the European Cup with Steaua in 1986, five Romanian championships, and was an established player of the Romania national team. After three seasons in Belgrade, he continued his career in Spanish La Liga with Valencia, Valladolid and Villarreal, before finishing his career in Mexico playing with Atlante. He made over 50 appearances for the Romania national team and was part of Romanian squad at the 1994 FIFA World Cup, UEFA Euro 1996 and UEFA Euro 2000. After retiring, he became executive director in the Romanian Football Federation responsible for the youth program.
  Ilija Najdoski, born in Kruševo, SR Macedonia, was one of the key Vardar players during the 1980s. He joined Red Star in 1988. After four seasons with the Red & Whites, he moved to Spain where he played two seasons in La Liga with Valladolid. He later played with Denizlispor, CSKA Sofia and Sion before retiring. He was Yugoslav international, and later during the mid-1990s one of the most experienced players of the Macedonian national team. For a short period he was in the direction board of the Football Federation of Macedonia. His son, Dino, also became a footballer.
  Goran Vasilijević, born in SR Serbia, played with Zemun and Radnički Niš before coming to Red Star. He later played in Bulgaria and Japan.
  Rade Tošić, born near Ugljevik, SR Bosnia and Herzegovina, a Bosnian Serb, he played most of the 1980s with Sloboda Tuzla. He became Yugoslav national team player and was signed by Hajduk Split in 1988. After two seasons in which he displayed great performances with Hajduk, it became no surprise that it was time for the next step in the evolution of his career, which effectively materialised by his signing with Red Star. He spent two seasons with Red Star at the peak of his career, which later continued in Spain where he played with Mérida and Castellón.

Midfielders:
  Vladimir Jugović, born in Milutovac, SR Serbia, was one of the top Yugoslav midfielders during the 1990s. He came at young age to Red Star, and three seasons were all he needed to make the journey from anonymity to the glory of climbing to top continental and world podiums, and win it all. While Red Star fans could obviously be proud for their club being a giant which managed to bring and attract a constellation of stars formed by most of the best players from the entire region, Jugović provided them a different, special, pride for being a product of their academy and managing to shine and earn his spot in such a privileged group. When time arrived for his departure, he joined Sampdoria in 1992, later made an impressive career in Serie A with Juventus, Lazio and Inter. Jugović played in the Italian Serie A until 2001, with the exception of the 1998–99 season that he played in the Spanish La Liga with Atlético Madrid. He played 41 matches for the Yugoslav national team, scoring on three occasions, playing at the 1998 FIFA World Cup and UEFA Euro 2000. Among all members of this generation, he is the one that won most trophies in his career. After ending his career, he spent a short period in the direction board of Red Star. Later he became certified players agent and spends much of his time scouting players and helping them build a successful career. He has established himself in Vienna, but spends time regularly in Belgrade, Monaco and Palma de Mallorca.
  Robert Prosinečki, born in Schwenningen, West Germany, is a son of Yugoslav emigrants. He started playing while still in Germany, in the youth team of Stuttgarter Kickers. In 1980, his family decided to move back to Yugoslavia. Arriving with high recommendations and displaying unique technical skills, Prosinečki was admitted in the renown Dinamo Zagreb academy. He made it to the seniors and debuted for Dinamo in the 1986–87 season. Despite debuting with a goal, Dinamo coach Miroslav Blažević only gave him one more appearance in the league that season. Clearly showing not much appreciation for Prosinečki's talent, Blažević refused to give him a professional contract, further claiming, in what later became his famous quote, that he would eat his shoe if Prosinečki ever becomes a professional player. Consequently, after season ended, Prosinečki went on trial with Red Star, where football director, club legend Dragan Džajić, along with coach Velibor Vasović, immediately recognised his talent and offered him a contract. This resulted in one of the most successful and lucrative transfers ever in football history, in which Red Star got Prosinečki from one of their main rivals, Dinamo, for free! With his signature on the contract still wet, Prosinečki joined the rest of the Yugoslav U20 team on their way to Chile where they showed the world the quality of Yugoslav football at that time, and conquered the gold at the 1987 FIFA World Youth Championship, with Prosinečki taking the best of this opportunity to show his talent and earn the best player of the tournament title. Despite facing a team full of excellent established players, he adapted immediately and earned his spot in Red Star's first team in his first season upon arrival. He proved wrong all those who didn't believe in him, and his four seasons at Red Star became one of the most successful and happiest stories ever in football. When time came for departure, in 1991, it was no surprise his destination could only be what is in number of titles and many other parameters the greatest team in the world, Real Madrid. He spent three seasons in Madrid with Real, and another three also in Spanish La Liga, with Oviedo, Barcelona and Sevilla, one season with each. By this time the old Yugoslavia got dismembered, and Prosinečki chose to represent his father's country, Croatia. He became a regular in the Croatian national team and played with them in the UEFA Euro 1996, 1998 FIFA World Cup (where Croatia finished third) and 2002 FIFA World Cup. After retiring, he became a coach. He started as assistant of Slaven Bilić in the Croatian national team and then it was precisely Red Star that gave him the chance to debut as main coach, where he stayed between 2010 and 2012.
  Dejan Savićević, born in Titograd, SR Montenegro, was playing with Budućnost when, during the 1987–88 season, he became a transfer target to all big Yugoslav clubs. The back then 21-year-old talented youngster ended up signing with Red Star at the end of the season and he will become one of club's legends. He was only 20 when he debuted for the Yugoslav national team and since then became a regular. He stayed four seasons with Red Star, a period which was crowned with the 1991 European Cup and 1991 Intercontinental Cup. Besides, he was awarded as the Yugoslav best athlete that same year. In 1992, he joined A.C. Milan and stayed at San Siro for the next six and a half years. With Milan he won the 1994 UEFA Champions League and the 1994 European Super Cup, besides three Serie A titles and two Supercoppa Italiana titles. He became known by the Milan fans as Maestro and one of his main highlights was the goal he scored against Barcelona in the 1994 UEFA Champions League Final. He left Milan during the 1998–99 winter break and joined again Red Star. However, he stayed only until the end of that season, and left to Rapid Wien where he played two more years before retiring. During the entire 1990s he was among the key players of the Yugoslav national team, and has played in the 1990 and 1998 FIFA World Cups. After retiring, he coached FR Yugoslavia national team for a period, and in 2004 he became the president of the Football Association of Montenegro.
  Siniša Mihajlović, born in Vukovar, SR Croatia, a Serb from Croatia, started playing with a local club, Borovo, from where he moved to Vojvodina. He was part of Vojvodina golden generation that won the Yugoslav championship in 1989. This, obviously, put him under Red Star radars and, year later, he was signed and became one of the most influential and charismatic players for the next seasons. Just as in Vojvodina championship winning season, at Red Star, he was also under coaching of Ljupko Petrović, and the great relation of the two coming from before, proved to be another of the major factors which contributed to Red Star major success. In 1992, when economical and sports sanctions were imposed to FR Yugoslavia not allowing its teams to compete internationally, he moved to Italy where he played the rest of his career with Serie A teams Roma, Sampdoria, Lazio and Inter. He is considered by numerous football specialists as one of the best free-kick takers of all time. He played 63 matches and scored 10 goals for the Yugoslav national team, and was present at the 1998 FIFA World Cup and UEFA Euro 2000. After retiring, he became a coach.
  Vlada Stošić, born in Vranje, SR Serbia, was only 19 when he came to Red Star in 1984. He stayed in the club until the winter break of the 1991–92 season when he moved to Spain, where he played with Mallorca and Betis during the mid-1990s. Then, in 1997, he joined Belodedici in Mexico and played a season at Atlante. He ended his career in Portugal playing with Vitória de Setúbal. He played one match for the Yugoslav national team in 1990. Since mid-1990s, he became involved in the direction of Betis where he became sports director.
  Ivica Momčilović, born in Bojnik, SR Serbia, played with Napredak before joining Red Star. Afterwards, he played in Cyprus and Sweden.

Forwards:
  Darko Pančev, born in Skopje, SR Macedonia, started playing with Vardar where he debuted as senior in 1982. He impressed by becoming Yugoslav First League top scorer in the 1983–84 season while being only 19. Red Star brought him in the summer of 1988 and during the four seasons he spent in Belgrade, he became club's main goalscorer. He was again Yugoslav championship top scorer in three seasons in a row between 1989 until 1992, and he won the European Golden Boot in 1991. He made 91 appearances and scored 84 goals in the league for Red Star. In 1992 he signed with Inter, however he didn't adapt well in Italy, and afterwards he played in Germany and Switzerland. Regarded as one of the best Macedonian players ever, he was a regular in the Yugoslav national team during the late 1980s and played with Yugoslavia in the 1990 FIFA World Cup. Later, he played for the Macedonian national team in their historical first matches between 1993 and 1995. After retiring, he worked shortly in the Macedonian Football Federation and, later, became the sports director of Vardar. However, he decided to step away from football and dedicate to a cafe that he owns in Skopje.
  Dragiša Binić, born in Kruševac, SR Serbia, played with Napredak and Radnički Niš before joining Red Star in 1987. He played with Red Star only one season and will play with French side Brest and Spanish Levante before returning to a second spell with Red Star in what was the European Cup winning season. After that season he moved abroad again, playing with a number of clubs such as Slavia Prague, APOEL and Nagoya Grampus. He played for the Yugoslav national team in 1990 and 1991. After retiring, he entered the direction board of FK Obilić, first as a sports director, and then as club president. He kept his ties with Red Star by being member of the club assembly. He was also the president of Napredak Kruševac. His son, Vladan, is also a footballer.
  Vladan Lukić, born in Sopot, SR Serbia, came to Red Star in 1986 aged only 16. His great scoring abilities made him become a regular in the Yugoslav national team in 1991, however his luck turned around in a match against Austria when he got an injury. He left Red Star in 1993 when he joined Atlético Madrid. During his career, until 2000, he also played with Vojvodina, OFK Beograd, Marbella, Sion, Metz and Paniliakos. In 1998, he played two more games for FR Yugoslavia national team. After retiring, he became the chairman of his hometown club, FK Sopot, and between 2009 and 2012 he was Red Star president.
  Ljubiša Milojević, forward, born in SR Serbia, was a Rad academy player who was brought to Red Star exclusively this season. Having debuted as senior with Rad a season earlier, he managed to impress with consistency and skills for such a young player. Brought to be the ultimate option, ended up not having his chance in Europe, and, at the end of the season moved back to Rad. In 1992, he moved to Greece where he gained notoriety at Aris Thessaloniki where he played five seasons. He ended his career at Panetolikos.

It is important to mention the other players which were part of the squad, and which, although not having appearances in the European Cup games, contributed as well by replacing those when injuries, sanctions, or needs of rotation, were necessary. They were:

  Aleksandar Ilić, defender, born in Niš, SR Serbia, debuted as senior precisely in this season at Red Star, and moved on to a career that included clubs in Serbia, Spain, Greece, Belgium and Netherlands. He begin his coaching career in 2007, and after Serbia and Greece, he has mostly been working in Saudi Arabia, and, more recently, Iraq.
  Dejan Joksimović, midfielder, born in Belgrade, SR Serbia, started his career in the capital by playing with Rad and OFK Beograd, before arriving to Red Star to have his first spell at the club in the season 1987–88. He spent the next two seasons at Vojvodina and Partizan, becoming one of the first and few players who have played for all three top Serbian clubs. Back in 1990 for his second spell at Red Star, he made the jackpot and became part of the team in the most successful season in all Serbian and Yugoslav club football history. At the end of the season, he moved to Sparta Prague and played as well with CD Lugo and Heidelberg United before retiring. Afterwards, he stayed in football by becoming a players agent.
  Ivan Adžić, midfielder, born in Belgrade, SR Serbia, is a product of Red Star's academy. Having debuted in the previous season, he made only league appearances in this season, however, unlike most others, he stayed in the club much longer afterwards, all until 1996. Except one 6-months loan spell at Borac Banja Luka in 1991, he was steady in the club and became regular starter in the most difficult period of the UN sanctions. After making 114 league appearances for Red Star, he moved to Logroñés to play in Spanish La Liga, and later played with Spanish Toledo, Borac Čačak back home, before finishing his career in 1999 in Austrian Rapid Wien. Between 2004 and 2006, he was assistant manager to Ratko Dostanić and Walter Zenga at Red Star, and main coach of Montenegrin side Rudar Pljevlja. He held the post of football director in Red Star between 2009 and 2011.
  Duško Savić, midfielder, born in SR Bosnia and Herzegovina, a Bosnian Serb, made his name in FK Sloboda Tuzla where Red Star picked him in 1990. Utilitarian player, he moved abroad in 1992 for a spell with Ionikos in Greek Super League.

In 1990, transfer market was already highly active, and this meant a number of players moved in, or out, at winter-break, having been present only half of the season. They were:
  Goran Jurić, defender, born in Mostar, SR Bosnia and Herzegovina, a Bosnian Croat, he gained notoriety playing in Velež before joining Red Star. Afterwards, he played in Spain, Croatia and Japan. He was member of the Croatian squad at the 1998 FIFA World Cup where Croatia finished third.
  Mitar Mrkela, midfielder, born in Belgrade, SR Serbia, began his career in 1981 with OFK Beograd from where he transferred to Red Star in 1983. When he debuted for OFK at the age of 16 he became, at the time, the youngest ever player to play in the Yugoslav First League. In Red Star, he became one of the key players of the mid-1980s. Unknowing it was the start of one historical season, he started the 1990–91 season by making his 154th league appearance for Red Star, when he decided to accept a move to Dutch side FC Twente. Watching his former teammates reach the glory from a TV in Netherlands, he went on to be a regular player at Twente where he spent two seasons, and afterwards he played in Turkish side Beşiktaş J.K. and Dutch SC Cambuur. He was also a Yugoslav international between 1982 and 1986. Upon retiring, he has been involved with football. In early 2000s, he became president of the Belgrade Football Association. In OFK Beograd, he held the posts of youth team coach and later sports director. At Red Star, he held a post of youth academy director.
  Enes Bešić, midfielder, born in SR Bosnia and Herzegovina, made his name at Čelik Zenica where he became a key player between 1980 and 1988, when he was brought by Red Star. A utilitarian player known as a trusted substitute, he made 24 league appearances at Red Star during his two and a half years stay. He made three league and one cup appearance in this season before moving abroad during winter-break and signing with Portuguese side Salgueiros, known during 1990s for having a vast ex-Yugoslav colony.
  Milorad Ratković, midfielder, born in Zenica, SR Bosnia and Herzegovina, began his career in 1983 at Čelik Zenica where he was teammate of Bešić for three seasons. Red Star brought him in the summer of 1990 but, by winter, he had managed to get a chance to make only one appearance in league and one in cup. Being an established experienced player, he desired more game play, thus his loan move to Borac Banja Luka was agreed that same winter. He returned to Red Star following season and became a key player in 1991–92. This earned him a move to Spanish La Liga and a contract with Celta de Vigo where his performances made him became a fans favourite in the six seasons he spent there, between 1992 and 1998. He finished his career in Spain with a one-season spell with Sevilla FC.
  Slaviša Čula, forward, born in Kostolac, SR Serbia, began his career in 1988 and played with Napredak and Sutjeska before joining Red Star in the summer of 1990. Utilitarian player, he was loaned to Proleter during winter-break of 1990–91. He made ten appearances in league for Red Star before moving to Borac Banja Luka in 1992. Between 1993 and 2001, he will become a globetrotter playing in Sweden, Romania, Israel and Cyprus. He ended his career at his hometown club Rudar Kostolac in 2005.

Results

Yugoslav First League

Yugoslav Cup

European Cup

First round

Second round

Quarter-finals

The match was stopped in the 78th minute by the match referee Emilio Soriano Aladrén, due to Dynamo Dresden fans causing commotion in the stands and throwing objects onto the field. Red Star Belgrade led 2–1 at the time. UEFA awarded a 3–0 win to Red Star Belgrade. Red Star Belgrade won 6–0 on aggregate.

Semi-finals

Final

See also
 List of Red Star Belgrade seasons

References

Red Star Belgrade seasons
UEFA Champions League-winning seasons
Red Star
Red Star
Yugoslav football championship-winning seasons